Memecylon umbellatum, commonly known as ironwood, anjani (Marathi) or alli (Telugu), is a small tree found in India, the Andaman islands and the coastal region of the Deccan. It is also found in Sri Lanka, where it is called blue mist, kora-kaha (Sinhala language) and kurrikaya (Tamil language). The leaves contain a yellow dye, a glucoside, which is used for dyeing the robes of Buddhist monks and for colouring reed mats (Dumbara mats). Medicinally, the leaves are said to have anti-diarrhoeal properties. Historically, this plant was burnt as fuel in the production of Wootz steel.

Names
Botanical Name : Memecylon umbellatum
English : Ironwood
Sinhala : කොරකහ (Korakaha)
Sanskrit : अंजन (Anjan)
Hindi : अंजन (Anjan)
Marathi : अंजनी (Anjani)
Konkani : काळ्यो आंक्र्यो (Kalleo ankrio)
Kannada : ಒಳ್ಳಯ ಕುಡಿ (Ollayakudi)
Telugu : అల్లి (Alli)
Tamil : காயா (Kaya)
Malayalam : കാഞ്ഞാവ് (Kaannaav), കായാമ്പൂ (Kaayaaboo), കാശാവ്‌ (Kasavu)

Description
It is a large shrub or small tree. Its bark and branches are very hard. That is why it is called Ironwood (or possibly because of its important historical role in the production of Wootz steel). Leaves are simple, opposite type. Leaves contain glucose. Flowers are blue coloured and produced in cymose umbels. The fruit is round berry bluish-black in colour. Flowering time is February to March.

References

umbellatum
Plants described in 1768
Taxa named by Nicolaas Laurens Burman